PraxisAuril, formerly known as PraxisUnico, is a UK based national professional association for Knowledge Exchange & Commercialisation (KEC) practitioners. As of 2022, the association includes over 4,000 active KE practitioners who come from over 180 member organizations, working primarily in university and public sector research settings. A key focus is on IP commercialisation.

Members 
The association has 170+ member organisations across Higher Education Institutions (HEIs) and Public Sector Research Establishments (PSREs), and a network of 5000+ individuals, who are involved in KEC.

History 
PraxisUnico was formed in 2009 from two separate organisations - Praxis (involved in training for technology transfer officers in universities and research centres) and UNICO which was a membership organisation including universities and PSRE organisations. In 2017, PraxisUnico joined forces with Auril to form a new organisation in the name of "PraxisAuril".

Current and past chairs
Chairs of PraxisAuril have included:

 Iain Thomas, University of Cambridge: 2021-present
 Sean Fielding, University of Exeter: 2019–2021
Angela Kukula, ICR: 2015–2019
 Sue O’Hare, City University London: 2013-2015
 Douglas Robertson, University of Edinburgh : 2011-2013
 David Secher, University of Cambridge: 2009-2011

Activities 

It runs training courses for KEC professionals within the UK and outside and runs events and networking activities. It says that it aims to “facilitate interactions between the public sector research base, business and government by bringing together key stakeholders to debate, educate and inform.” It also works to represent the KEC sector in policy consultations. International activity is led by Nessa Carey.

Founder member of ATTP 
It is a founder member of the Alliance of Technology Transfer Professionals(ATTP).  ATTP confers the world-recognized Registered Technology Transfer Professional (RTTP) designation. RTTP status recognizes the accomplishments, roles, skills, knowledge, and deal-making expertise of technology transfer professionals. There are over 320 RTTPs recognised globally.

Impact Awards for KEC professionals 
The Impact Awards were introduced by PraxisUnico in 2009. In 2015, PraxisUnico partnered with Research Councils UK to deliver the awards jointly. The awards are open to members and non-members. The 2015 categories and winners included:

 Contribution to Business: University of Leicester, ASDEC 
 Contribution to Society: Public Health England, Ebola on the Frontline 
 Outstanding KEC Initiative: Centre for Global Eco-Innovation, Lancaster University, Liverpool University and Inventya 
The overall winner in 2015 was the University of Leicester for the ASDEC project. Details of these and previous winners are available on the Impact Awards website.
The Impact Awards are not scheduled to run in 2016, with a showcase of past winners taking place at the PraxisUnico Conference instead.

Consultations 
PraxisAuril has represented the KEC and TT sector in numerous Government consultations

References

External links
 PraxisUnico

British companies established in 2009
Innovation in the United Kingdom
Innovation organizations
Knowledge transfer